Bonsoir is a 1994 French film directed by Jean-Pierre Mocky.

Plot 
Having first lost his wife, then his job as a tweed tailor, Alex Ponttin (Michel Serrault) has devised a novel way to keep himself in touch with society.  He admits himself into people's homes by pretending to be a relative or an official and persuading his victims to give him a night's free board. He finds at first a lunch with the horrible couple Dumont (Jean-Pierre Bisson and Maike Jansen), where a thief follows him for a robbery. Alex spent an evening in front of TV at Marie (Marie-Christine Barrault), mother of seven children. He runs from Marie to find an evening and a new bed at the home of charming but shy lesbian Caroline (Claude Jade) and her funny lover Gloria (Corinne Le Poulain).  
To save her inheritance, Caroline - accused for her homosexuality by her horrible sister Catherine (Laurence Vincendon) - tells her aunt Amélie (Monique Darpy) that Gloria is her secretary and Alex her lover. Alex has to present himself nude in Caroline's bed. He saves Caroline's inheritance.
The police officers (Jean-Claude Dreyfus) investigating the case are so terminally stupid that Alex has little chance of being arrested.

As in many of Jean-Pierre Mocky's films, there is a strong anti-establishment, almost anarchist subtext.  This is manifested in the way that the self-proclaimed moral figures (the police, the clergy, even the President of the Republic) are presented in this film, but also in the elevation of Alex Ponttin to the status of a public hero at the end of the film.  Whilst society and state sink into a numbing inertia, bereft of integrity and humanity, it is left to the eccentrics, the outsiders like worried Caroline, who is attacked by her sister and her aunt because the secret of her homosexuality, to build a more cohesive society and a better world.
Michel Serrault excels in this off-the-wall satirical comedy which makes a bizarre assessment of modern life. He plays an impish vagrant who uses his new-found freedom to improve the lives of his fellow man, by briefly insinuating himself into their lives. Bonsoir goes much further and suggests that whole of modern society, not only the police, is culpable of mediocrity and moral laxity. It takes an outsider like Alex Ponttin, free from the bonds of modern living, to point the way to a better future.

Cast 
Michel Serrault as Alex Ponttin
Claude Jade as Caroline Winberg
Marie-Christine Barrault as Marie
Corinne Le Poulain as Gloria
Jean-Claude Dreyfus as Bruneau
Jean-Pierre Bisson as Marcel Dumont
Maike Jansen as Yvonne Dumont
Laura Grandt as Greta
Catherine Mouchet as Eugénie
Serge Riaboukine as Father Bonfils
Laurence Vincendon as Caroline's sister
Monique Darpy as Caroline's aunt
Dominique Zardi as Caroline's neighbour

See also 
 Cinema of France
 List of French language films

References

External links

 
Bonsoir at DVDtoile

1994 films
French LGBT-related films
Lesbian-related films
1990s French-language films
1994 LGBT-related films
Films directed by Jean-Pierre Mocky
1990s French films